Manonmaniam Sundaranar University is a university in the Indian state of Tamil Nadu. It was hived off the Madurai Kamaraj University on 7 September 1990.

The motto of the university is "In Pursuit of Excellence". It is named after the Tamil scholar/professor Manonmaniam Sundaram Pillai. The university has 24 departments in arts, languages, sciences, engineering and technology. 102 colleges in the Kanyakumari, Tenkasi, Thoothukudi and Tirunelveli districts are affiliated to it.

Campuses
Its main campus is a  site in Abishekapatti, Tirunelveli where the majority of the university departments function. Another  campus at Alwarkurichi houses the Sri Parama Kalyani Centre for Environmental Sciences department and a  campus at Rajakkamangalam houses the Centre for Marine Sciences and Technology.

Constituents
The university has 61 affiliated colleges, 5 Mano colleges and 1 constituent college, with 65,000 students on rolls under its jurisdiction.

Foundation
Manonmaniam Sundaranar University, named after the famous Tamil scholar/professor M. Sundaram Pillai, was established on 7 September 1990 to cater to the needs of the people of the three southernmost districts of Tamil Nadu — Tirunelveli, Tuticorin and Kanyakumari.

Departments
There are 28 academic departments in the university.

 Animal Science
 Biotechnology
 Chemistry
 Commerce
 Communication
 Computer Science & Engineering
 Criminology & Criminal Justice Science
 Economics
 Education
 English
 Environmental Science
 Geo-technology
 History
 Centre for Information Technology & Engineering
 Management Studies
 Marine Science
 Mathematics
 Pharmaceutical Chemistry
 Physics
 Physical Education & Sports
 Plant Science
 Psychology
 Renewable Energy
 Social Exclusion
 Sociology
 Statistics
 Tamil
 DDCE-B.Ed

Sri Paramakalyani Centre for Environmental Sciences functioning at Alwarkurichi is an example of university-industry collaboration while the Centre for Marine Science and Technology at Rajakkamangalam runs Coastal Area Studies.

The departments receive research projects from funding agencies in India, Europe, the United States, Japan and UNO. The university offers postgraduate, M.Phil. and Ph.D. programmes (part-time and full-time). MSU is the first to offer Choice-Based Credit System. The university has a National Service Scheme and Youth Welfare Department.

Accreditations
The University Grants Commission, New Delhi has accorded its approval for getting financial assistance since 29 March 1994. The university is accredited by the National Assessment and Accreditation Council of India with 'A' grade status. The University Act authorizes the functioning of the Directorate of Distance and Continuing Education outside the university jurisdiction and the courses offered through this mode are recognized by the Distance Education Council of India.

Community colleges
The community colleges offer diploma courses of one-year duration to those interested in entrepreneurial enterprises. The Extension Learning Programme offers diploma and certificate courses on skill development.

See also
Sri Parasakthi College for Women

References

External links

 
 MSU online learning programs

 
Education in Tirunelveli
Educational institutions established in 1990
1990 establishments in Tamil Nadu